Elsa Zylberstein (born Elsa Florence Zylbersztejn,  16 October 1968) is a French film, TV, and stage actress. After studying drama, Zylberstein began her film career in 1989, and has appeared in more than 60 films. She won the César Award for Best Supporting Actress for I've Loved You So Long (2008).

Early life
Zylberstein was born Elsa Florence Zylbersztejn in Paris to an Ashkenazi Jewish Polish father, Albert Zylbersztejn (born 1938), and a French Catholic mother, Liliane Chenard (born 1940). Her father is a physicist and her mother was a beautician for Dior. She has a brother, Benjamin (born  1970). Zylberstein felt both Jewish and Christian; now she is "attracted to Buddhist rites". She has practised classical dance since her childhood. After a Baccalauréat A3, she began university and studied English, but she was strongly attracted to artistic pursuits. She studied acting under Francis Huster at the Cours Florent on the advice of Charlotte Rampling, whom Elsa Zylberstein's father met by chance on a plane, and also works with a professor at the Actors Studio.

Career

In 1991, Elsa Zylberstein appeared in Van Gogh, a film directed by Maurice Pialat. In 1992, she won the Michel Simon Prize and the first of her three nominations for the César Award for Most Promising Actress. In 1993, she played a student in Beau fixe, and won the Prix Romy Schneider.

She inspired young directors such as Pascale Bailly, Diane Bertrand and especially Martine Dugowson, who offered her the lead role alongside Romane Bohringer in Mina Tannenbaum (1994). She then appeared in Farinelli, Mr N., and Jefferson in Paris. She played Suzanne Valadon in Lautrec, and then Jeanne Hébuterne in Modigliani. Zylberstein played a Yiddish-language singer who falls in love with a gay clarinetist in Man Is a Woman, which also starred Antoine de Caunes. She also appeared in the films Time Regained, Love Torn in a Dream, and That Day, all three of which were directed by Raúl Ruiz.

In 2006 she played Mathilde, an Orthodox Jewish woman faced with marriage problems, in Little Jerusalem. She also appeared in J'invente rien, based on a novel by Christine Angot. In 2008, she was in two films which were each presented at the Berlin Festival: I've Loved You So Long, with Kristin Scott Thomas, and La Fabrique des sentiments.

In 2009, she won the César Award for Best Supporting Actress for her role in I've Loved You So Long. The film was directed by Philippe Claudel and also starred Kristin Scott Thomas.

She has been a member of several festival juries, including the 1999 American Film Festival in Deauville, the 2010 British Film Festival in Dinard, the Beaune International Detective Film Festival (in both 2009 and 2015) and the prestigious Cannes Film Festival in 2021.

In 2020, she won the Best Acting Award for Tout nous sourit at the Alpe d'Huez Comedy Festival.

Personal life
Zylberstein dated Antoine de Caunes between 1997 and 2005. She then dated Nicolas Bedos from 2005 to 2008. Later she dated Georges-Marc Benamou, advisor to former French president Nicolas Sarkozy, although she is a staunch supporter of the Socialist Party.

In 2009, Zylberstein signed a petition in support of film director Roman Polanski, calling for his release after Polanski was arrested in Switzerland in relation to his 1977 sexual abuse case.

Filmography

Theatre

References

External links

 Official web site
 
 
 
 Elsa Zylberstein – Actrices Francaises

1972 births
Living people
French film actresses
French television actresses
French people of Polish-Jewish descent
French stage actresses
Jewish French actresses
Best Supporting Actress César Award winners
Cours Florent alumni
20th-century French actresses
21st-century French actresses